The 1896 World Allround Speed Skating Championships took place at 7 and 8 February 1896 at the ice rink Joesoepovski Park in Saint Petersburg, Russia. Jaap Eden was the defending champion, he extended his title by winning all four distances.

Allround results 

  * = Fell
 NC = Not classified
 NF = Not finished
 NS = Not started
 DQ = Disqualified
Source: SpeedSkatingStats.com

Rules 
Four distances had to be skated: 500, 1500, 5000 and 10,000 m. One could earn the world title only by winning at least three of the four distances, otherwise the title would become vacant. Silver and bronze medals were not awarded.

References 

World Allround Speed Skating Championships, 1896
1896 World Allround
World Allround, 1896
Sports competitions in Saint Petersburg
1896 in the Russian Empire
February 1896 sports events
1890s in Saint Petersburg